Deaf Chonky is an Israeli folk, garage, punk rock duo. The band members are Adi Bronicki, Tami Kaminsky and Tom Mckinna.

Early years

The two members of Deaf Chonky grew up in Rehovot, Israel where they met near the local bank. Their name was given to them by Kaminsky's father, and means "Girls" in Russian.

Musical influences
The band's musical influences are varied, with garage-punk, Folk punk and Russian folk music as the more notable genres. In a 2016 interview, the band noted Blind Man Deaf Boy, Crass, Honey Bane and Billy Childish as their main musical influences.

Discography

References

External links

 
 

All-female punk bands
Garage rock groups
Israeli punk rock groups
Musical groups with year of establishment missing
Israeli musical duos
Female musical duos
People from Rehovot
Rock music duos